Mary Lou Sallee (May 10, 1930 – April 6, 2018) was an American Republican politician who served in the Missouri House of Representatives.

Born in Seymour, Missouri, she attended Springfield Senior High School, Southwest Missouri State University, Drury College, and the University of Illinois.  She previously worked as a teacher and coach for Ava High School in Ava, Missouri.

References

1930 births
2018 deaths
20th-century American politicians
21st-century American politicians
20th-century American women politicians
21st-century American women politicians
Republican Party members of the Missouri House of Representatives
People from Webster County, Missouri
Women state legislators in Missouri